The Independents (abbreviated DU, meaning "YOU" in German) is a right-wing populist Eurosceptic political party in Liechtenstein. In the 2013 parliamentary election, the first they contested, they won 29,740 votes (15.3%) and four seats in the Landtag. DU is headed by former Patriotic Union parliamentarian Harry Quaderer.

International commentators suggested that the party had benefited from protest votes against austerity measures.

Political positions
DU is not a party in the traditional sense, having incorporated as a party solely to take advantage of the financial and political rights associated with that status; its platform calls for Members of the Landtag to be able to vote based on their own convictions rather than party pressures. According to Leiden University political science professor Wouter Veenendaal, the DU has an ideology "similar to that of the Progressive Citizens' Party and the Patriotic Union but its style is brasher."

The DU is "critical about migration and European integration." In 2015 the party called for Liechtenstein to reject the European Union's proposed resettlement of refugees, specifically stating that the EU policies "led by Merkel's Germany" were absurd.

Electoral history

Landtag elections

External links

References

Political parties in Liechtenstein
2013 establishments in Liechtenstein
Political parties established in 2013
Right-wing populism in Liechtenstein
Anti-immigration politics in Europe